Herbert Edward Palmer (10 February 1880 – 17 May 1961) was an English poet and literary critic.

He was born in Market Rasen, Lincolnshire, and educated at Woodhouse Grove School, Birmingham University and Bonn University. Before becoming a full-time writer and journalist in 1921, he led an itinerant life in teaching, tutoring and lecturing, working in particular for the W.E.A.; and spending many years in France and Germany.
 
He encouraged the young John Gawsworth. He introduced C. S. Lewis and Ruth Pitter in 1945/6.

Works

Two Fishers (1918)
Two Foemen (1920)
Two Minstrels (1921)
The Unknown Warrior (1924)
Songs of Salvation, Sin and Satire (1925)
The Judgement of François Villon (1927) play
Christmas Miniature (1928)
The Armed Muse (1930)
The Teaching of English (1930)
Cinder Thursday (1931)
What the Public Wants (1932) Blue Moon booklet
Collected Poems (1933) 
The Roving Angler (1933) essays, revised edition 1947
Summit and Chasm (1934) poems
The Mistletoe Child (1935) autobiography
The Vampire (1936)
Post-Victorian Poetry (1938) criticism
The Gallows Cross (1940)
Season and Festival (1943) Faber and Faber, poems
The Dragon of Tingalam: a fairy comedy (1945)
A Sword in the Desert (1946) poems
The Greenwood Anthology of New Verse (1948), compiled by Palmer
The Old Knight: a poem sequence for the present times (1949)
The Ride from Hell: a poem-sequence of the times for three voices (1958)

Notes

External links
 
 
  Herbert Palmer papers at Senate House Library, University of London
The Roving Angler by Herbert Palmer
 Herbert Edward Palmer Collection at the Harry Ransom Center

1880 births
1961 deaths
People from Market Rasen
People educated at Woodhouse Grove School
University of Bonn alumni
English male poets
20th-century English poets
20th-century English male writers